Karishma – The Miracles of Destiny is an Indian television serial which was first broadcast on Sahara One on 25 August 2003 and lasted over 262 episodes ending in October 2004. It starred Karisma Kapoor, Sanjay Kapoor, Arbaaz Khan, Arshad Warsi, Vikas Bhalla, Jugal Hansraj, and Ayub Khan. Created by Akashdeep, it was written by Sachin Bhowmick and directed by Anurag Basu. The title song was composed by Anu Malik and sung by Sonu Nigam and Sapna Mukherjee.

Plot
The serial follows the story of Devyani  who from humble beginnings went on to become a very successful businesswoman. The story begins with an aged Devyani, now a 67-year-old mother of two grown-up sons Jai and Sameer  and grandmother of Kunal, who is attending a ceremony to celebrate her life achievements. An attempt is made on her life when a gunman fires at her, but she survives as the bullet only scrapes past her arm. The hitman escapes. It is later revealed that her sons plot to have her killed to inherit her wealth. There is also a mysterious character named Aarnav who wants to write a novel based on Devyani's life but seems to have an ulterior motive.

The story shifts between Devyani in New Zealand and in Mumbai where a lookalike of Devyani named Avni (also Karisma Kapoor) is introduced. Her childhood friend Pakiya (Arshad Warsi) sees a picture of Devyani in a newspaper and tries to find a connection between Devyani and Avni. The story also goes in flashback of Devyani in her 20s and the men in her life including Arjun and Amar (played by Vikas Bhalla and Sanjay Kapoor).

Cast
 Karisma Kapoor as Devyani / Avni
 Sanjay Kapoor as Amar
 Arbaaz Khan as Aarnav
 Harsh Chhaya as Sameer 
 Ayub Khan as Jai
 Jugal Hansraj as Kunal (Sameer's son)
 Sheeba Akashdeep as Amrita (Sameer's wife)
 Resham Tipnis as Natasha (Jai's wife)
 Arshad Warsi as Pakiya
 Vikas Bhalla as Arjun 
 Vishwajeet Pradhan as Thakur (Arjun's elder brother and Aarnav's grandfather)
 Jayati Bhatia as Thakur's wife
Pavan Malhotra as Raja
 Sanober Kabir as Riya (Kunal's girlfriend)
 Tinnu Anand as Devyani's lawyer
 Vijay Raaz as Ladoo
 Raju Kher as Devyani's doctor
 Deepshikha Nagpal as Sanjana
 Saadhika Randhawa as Saadhika
 Mayuri Kango as Mansi (Devyani's daughter and Avni's mother)
 Rahul Roy as Rahul
 Uday Tikekar as Devyani's father

References

External links

Indian drama television series
Sahara One original programming
2003 Indian television series debuts
2004 Indian television series endings